Curacha Alavar, sometimes referred to as curacha con salsa Alavar ("Curacha with Alavar sauce") in Chavacano a Spanish-based creole language, is a Filipino dish made from spanner crabs (curacha), garlic, ginger, salt, and Alavar sauce. The key ingredient is the Alavar sauce, a secret blend of coconut milk, taba ng talangka (crab roe paste), and various spices.

It is a regional specialty of the Zamboanga City. The sauce was invented by Maria Teresa Camins Alavar and is originally served in the Alavar Seafood Restaurant. The restaurant now sells the original Alavar sauce recipe in packets. It is a variant of the traditional ginataang curacha (curacha in coconut milk). The recipe can also be made with mud crabs (cangrejo) or prawns (locon).

See also

Ginataang hipon
 Halabos
 Ginataan

References

Philippine cuisine